Agnieszka Winczo (born 24 August 1984) is a Polish football player.

Career
Winczo plays for SV Meppen in the Frauen-Bundesliga. She previously played for Czarni Sosnowiec, Gol Częstochowa and Unia Racibórz in the Polish Ekstraliga. She was the championship's top scorer in 2011.

Winczo has made several appearances for the Poland women's national football team, including four times in the 2007 FIFA Women's World Cup qualifying rounds. She made her debut in a friendly against Ukraine on 27 March 2004. She has also played for the team in the 2011 FIFA Women's World Cup qualifying rounds, scoring a hat-trick in a 4–1 away victory over Romania on 31 March 2010. She earned her 100th cap for the national team on 5 April 2019 against Italy.

International goals

References

External links
Profile at UB2009.org

1984 births
Living people
Polish women's footballers
Poland women's international footballers
Expatriate women's footballers in Germany
Place of birth missing (living people)
Women's association football forwards
SC Sand players
Frauen-Bundesliga players
FIFA Century Club
RTP Unia Racibórz players
KKS Czarni Sosnowiec players
Polish expatriate sportspeople in Germany